Alessandro Ranellucci (born 25 February 1983) is an Italian football player. He plays for Latina.

Club career
He made his Serie C debut for Pro Vercelli on 14 September 2011 in a game against Como.

References

External links
 

1983 births
Sportspeople from the Province of Latina
Footballers from Lazio
Living people
Italian footballers
Association football defenders
Avezzano Calcio players
A.S. Martina Franca 1947 players
Valenzana Mado players
U.S. Vibonese Calcio players
F.C. Pro Vercelli 1892 players
FeralpiSalò players
Latina Calcio 1932 players
Serie B players
Serie C players
Serie D players